ESPOL may refer to:

 Escuela Superior Politécnica del Litorala public institution of higher education, located in Guayaquil, Ecuador. ESPOL has garnered great historical prestige, demonstrating notable efforts in its research branches and constant academic excellence. In September 2012, ESPOL is integrated into the Ecuadorian Network of Universities and Polytechnic Schools for Research and Postgraduate Studies - REDU, which works together with the other Category "A" Universities of Ecuador to promote research work of excellence and postgraduate degrees. ESPOL ranks third in the scores of its graduates for applicants for a scholarship at the Universities of Ecuador. The Quacquarelli Symonds (QS) Ranking classifies ESPOL among the Best Universities in Latin America. Webometrics in February 2013 (First Edition) and in July 2013 (Second Edition), placed ESPOL in the First Place of the Ranking of Ecuadorian Universities. In the February 2014 publication, ESPOL is ratified leading with the First Place in said Ranking.
 The European School of Political and Social Sciencesa non-profit private higher education institution located in Lille, France.
 Executive Systems Problem Oriented Languagea systems implementation language for Burroughs Corporation computers.